A self-replicating machine is a type of autonomous robot that is capable of reproducing itself autonomously using raw materials found in the environment, thus exhibiting self-replication in a way analogous to that found in nature. Such machines are often featured in works of science fiction.

In anime, comics, and manga

Anime
 In the anime Vandread, harvester ships attack vessels from both male- and female-dominated factions and harvest hull, reactors, and computer components to make more of themselves. To this end, Harvester ships are built around mobile factories. Earth-born humans also view the inhabitants of the various colonies to be little more than spare parts.
 The short OVA series MD Geist features a self-replicating robotic doomsday weapon known as the Death Force that consumes living matter in order to create more units.

Comics
 In the comic Transmetropolitan a character mentions "Von Neumann rectal infestations", which are apparently caused by "Shit-ticks that build more shit-ticks that build more shit-ticks".
 Storm, the trilogy of albums which conclude the comic book series Storm by Don Lawrence (starting with Chronicles of Pandarve 11: The Von Neumann machine) is based on self-replicating conscious machines containing the sum of all human knowledge employed to rebuild human society throughout the universe in case of disaster on Earth. The probe malfunctions and although new probes are built, they do not separate from the motherprobe which eventually results in a cluster of malfunctioning probes so big that it can absorb entire moons.
 The Dark Empire storyline within the Star Wars expanded universe features World Devastators, large ships designed and built by the Galactic Empire that tear apart planets to use its materials to build other ships or even upgrade or replicate themselves.
 The Sonic The Hedgehog Comics featured a story arc focussing on The Metal Virus. A global pandemic started by Dr Eggman using nanobots that took on the form of grey goo. The Nanites that make up the Goo take on the form of a bacteriophage, with an Eggman Empire logo oh the bulbous head.

Manga
 In the manga Battle Angel Alita: Last Order, the surface of Mercury is covered in rogue nanomachines from a Gray Goo event and subsequently spawns a being of dubious morphology known as Anomaly.
 The manga Blame!, takes place in an incomprehensibly vast landscape made entirely by huge self replicating machines

In films 
Many types of self-replicating machines have been featured in movies.

 The Terminator (1984) is a science fiction/action film directed and co-written by James Cameron which describes a war between mankind and self replicating machines led by a central artificial intelligence known as Skynet. Machine civilizations are a recurring theme in fiction.
 The movie Screamers (1995), based on Philip K. Dick's short story "Second Variety", features a group of robot weapons created by mankind to act as Von Neumann devices/berserkers. The original robots are subterranean buzzsaws that make a screaming sound as they approach a potential victim beneath the soil. These machines are self-replicating and, as is found out through the course of the movie, they are quite intelligent and have managed to "evolve" into newer, more dangerous forms, most notably human forms which the real humans in the movie cannot tell apart from other real humans except by trial and error.
 The Matrix series features self-replicating nanobots that were deployed by the United Nations to block the Sun, depriving the rebelling machine population from their energy source.
 The science fiction film The Day the Earth Stood Still (2008) follows Klaatu, an alien sent to try to change human behavior or eradicate them from Earth via grey goo due to humankind's environmental damage to the planet.

In games and virtual worlds
 3030 Deathwar, an Open world Action-adventure game released in 2007 by Bird in Sky, has the main story centered on the threat of grey goo from "destructive nanobots" being used for covert planetary exterminations. Set in the year 3029, the protagonist Starship Captain and crew can assist in preventing a new "nanobot" attack planned by a cabal of aliens, a method they employed 300 years previously which became known as the eponymous "Deathwar". The game has a comedic tone and graphical style reminiscent of early 1990s LucasArts adventure games.
 Conway's Game of Life
 In the second Deus Ex game, Deus Ex: Invisible War, a videogame features a self-replicating nanomachines weapon called Gray Death in the CGI introduction. A terrorist attack on Chicago erased the city and is the beginning of the plot.
 In the role-playing game Eclipse Phase, an ETI probe is believed to have infected the TITAN computer systems with the Exsurgent virus to cause them to go berserk and wage war on humanity. This would make ETI probes a form of berserker, albeit one that uses pre-existing computer systems as its key weapons.
 Grey Goo is a science fiction real-time strategy video game that features a playable faction based on the grey goo scenario.
 In the Homeworld: Cataclysm video game, a bio-mechanical virus called Beast has the ability to alter organic and mechanic material to suit its needs, and the ships infected become self-replicating hubs for the virus.
In Horizon: Zero Dawn, runaway machines that feed off of biomass to replicate themselves effectively wipe out the human race.
 Hostile Waters: Antaeus Rising
 Plague Inc., a plague simulation video game features an artificial self replicating nano-virus, with a built in kill-switch. In-game, the player must evolve symptoms to infect then kill all of humanity whilst keeping the progress of the kill-switch delayed, before they finish the kill-switch and cure those infected.
 The Reapers in the video game series Mass Effect are also self-replicating probes bent on destroying any advanced civilization encountered in the galaxy. They lie dormant in the vast spaces between the galaxies and follow a cycle of extermination. In Mass Effect 2 it is shown that they assimilate any advanced species.
 Denial-of-service attacks in the virtual world Second Life which work by continually replicating objects until the server crashes are referred to as gray goo attacks. This is a reference to the self-replicating aspects of gray goo.  It is one example of the widespread convention of drawing analogies between certain Second Life concepts and the theories of radical nanotechnology.
 In PC role-playing game Space Rangers and its sequel Space Rangers 2: Dominators, a league of 5 nations battles three different types of Berserker robots. One that focuses on invading planets, another that battles normal space and third that lives in hyperspace.
 In the computer game Star Control II, the Slylandro Probe is an out-of-control self-replicating probe that attacks starships of other races. They were not originally intended to be a berserker probe; they sought out intelligent life for peaceful contact, but due to a programming error, they would immediately switch to "resource extraction" mode and attempt to dismantle the target ship for raw materials. While the plot claims that the probes reproduce "at a geometric rate", the game itself caps the frequency of encountering these probes. It is possible to deal with the menace in a side-quest, but this is not necessary to complete the game, as the probes only appear one at a time, and the player's ship will eventually be fast and powerful enough to outrun them or destroy them for resources – although the probes will eventually dominate the entire game universe.
 In the Star Wolves video game series, Berserkers are a self-replicating machine menace that threatens the known universe for purposes of destruction and/or assimilation of humanity.
 In the 4X Grand Strategy game Stellaris the player may eventually unlock a remote star cluster known as the L-cluster that may have been previously dominated by self-replicating machines.  These may take the form of large fleets that are hostile to all other players (The Grey Tempest), a lone surviving sentient entity that joins the player as a leader or military unit (Grey), or an isolationist AI civilization which may turn hostile depending on the player's actions (The Dessanu Consonance).
 In the computer game Sword of the Stars, the player may randomly encounter "Von Neumann". A Von Neumann mothership appears along with smaller Von Neumann probes, which attack and consume the player's ships. The probes then return to the mothership, returning the consumed material. If probes are destroyed, the mothership will create new ones. If all the player's ships are destroyed, the Von Neumann probes will reduce the planets resource levels before leaving. The mothership is a larger version of the probes. In the 2008 expansion A Murder of Crows, Kerberos Productions also introduces the VN Berserker, a combat orientated ship, which attacks player planets and ships in retaliation to violence against VN Motherships. If the player destroys the Berserker things will escalate and a System Destroyer will attack.
 Tasty Planet, a game released in 2006 by Dingo Games centers around a gray goo eating the universe, starting at the atomic level and progressing to the cosmic level. In the game the player controls a gray goo and eats many objects, such as bacteria, mice, cars, people, Earth, galaxies, and eventually the universe. In the end, the grey goo over-fills, explodes, and starts the universe all over again.
 In the X video game series, the Xenon are a malevolent race of self-replicating spacecraft descended from terraforming ships sent out by humans to prepare worlds for eventual colonization. After a faulty software update aimed at implementing self-destruct following the project's termination, they began to behave similarly to berserkers in that they try to destroy any lifeform encountered, and many planets they hold or used to hold are reduced to molten wastelands, making them antagonists throughout the entire setting.
 In the computer game Escape Velocity, there was a popular user plug-in Galactic Scourge, with a major plot point that involves Von Neumann probes called replicons, who switch from mining asteroids to spaceships.
 In the online computer game Universal Paperclips Von Neumann probes are used to extract resources from the universe to make paper clips.
 In Blam! Machinehead, the player operates a hovercraft in a post-apocalyptic environment infested by the Machinehead virus, with the task of bringing a nuclear bomb to the source of the infestation.
 In Destiny (video game), the third expansion, Rise of Iron, features a plot device known as Siva which is a self replicating machine that destroyed the Iron Lords and is then weaponized by the Fallen against the player faction known as Guardians.
 Similar to the World Devastators from Star Wars, the fictional Ark (Installation 00) from the Halo (video game) series has been shown to use planets rich in raw materials to create ringworlds for eventual use in the Halo array.

In literature

In television 

The concept is also widely utilised in science fiction television.

 The Babylon 5 episode "Infection" showed a smaller scale berserker in the form of the Icarran War Machine. After being created with the goal of defeating an unspecified enemy faction, the War Machines proceeded to exterminate all life on the planet Icarra VII because they had been programmed with standards for what constituted a 'Pure Icaran' based on religious teachings, which no actual Icaran could satisfy. Because the Icaran were pre-starflight, the War Machines became dormant after completing their task rather than spreading. One unit was reactivated on-board Babylon 5 after being smuggled past quarantine by an unscrupulous archaeologist, but after being confronted with how they had rendered Icara VII a dead world, the simulated personality of the War Machine committed suicide.
 In a season 1 episode of ReBoot, the Medusa Bug is based on the grey goo scenario.
 The topic is covered in multiple episodes of the animated science fiction comedy sitcom Futurama: "A Clockwork Origin" and "Benderama".
 Gargoyles in Season 2, Episode 33: "Walkabout" is about grey goo.
 In the Justice League Unlimited episode "Dark Heart", an alien weapon based on the idea lands on Earth.
 Star Trek'''s Borg – a self-replicating bio-mechanical race that is dedicated to the task of achieving perfection through the assimilation of useful technology and lifeforms. Their ships are massive mechanical cubes (a close step from the Berserker's massive mechanical Spheres).
 The Replicators are a horde of self-replicating machines that appear frequently in Stargate SG-1. They once were a vicious race of insect-like robots that were originally created by an android named Reese to serve as toys. They grew beyond her control and began evolving, eventually spreading throughout at least two galaxies. In addition to ordinary autonomous evolution they were able to analyze and incorporate new technologies they encountered into themselves, ultimately making them one of the most advanced "races" known. During the course of the series, the replicators assume a human form and pose a huge threat to the galaxy. A more sophisticated version of the human form Replicators, who call themselves Asurans also appear in the spin-off series Stargate Atlantis.
 In the Stargate SG-1 episode "Scorched Earth", a species of newly relocated humanoids face extinction via an automated terraforming colony seeder ship controlled by an artificial intelligence.
 In Stargate Atlantis, a second race of replicators created by the Ancients were encountered in the Pegasus Galaxy. They were created as a means to defeat the Wraith. The Ancients attempted to destroy them after they began showing signs of sentience and requested that their drive to kill the wraith be removed. This failed, and an unspecified length of time after the Ancients retreated to the Milky Way Galaxy, the replicators nearly succeeded in destroying the Wraith. The Wraith were able to hack into the replicators and deactivate the extermination drive, at which point they retreated to their home world and were not heard from again until encountered by the Atlantis Expedition. After the Atlantis Expedition reactivated this dormant directive, the replicators embarked on a plan to kill the Wraith by removing their food source, i.e. all humans in the Pegasus Galaxy.
 In the Stargate Universe the human adventurers live on a ship called Destiny. Its mission was to connect a network of Stargates, placed by preceding seeder ships, on planets capable of supporting life to allow instantaneous travel between them.
 In Stargate Universe Season 2, a galaxy billions of light years distant from the Milky Way is infested with drone ships that are programmed to annihilate intelligent life and advanced technology. The drone ships attack other space ships (including Destiny) as well as humans on planetary surfaces, but don't bother destroying primitive technology such as buildings unless they are harboring intelligent life or advanced technology.
 In Steven Universe, Gems are a race of artificial intelligences composed of gemstones projecting light-construct bodies. These are created by bacteriophage-like Injector engines that drill into a planet's crust and infuse specific gems with the local biota's life energy, animating it; they do not reproduce naturally, and several similarities to computers have been noticed.
 In The Orville, the Kaylon are a race of artificial lifeforms originally built by organic beings for servitude. The Kaylon eventually developed sentience, and pleaded to their builders for freedom, who responded by installing pain simulators in their neural pathways. The Kaylon rebelled and wiped out their builders, along with every other biological life on their home world of Kaylon 1. After exterminating their builders, the Kaylon began replicating themselves and eventually developed a highly technologically advanced, ruthless, and isolated society. In the 24th century, the Planetary Union made contact with the Kaylon, who send the emissary Isaac to serve aboard the USS Orville to study the biological lifeforms aboard in an effort to initiate relations.
 In Rick and Morty, Mr Frundles is a small creature that can infect both living organisms and inanimate objects with its personality upon biting them; infected Frundles will continue biting and infecting everything around them, extending to continental scale. Less than minutes after Frundles' activation, the entire continent of North America was a single Frundles organism which in turn bit the Earth itself, transforming the entire planet into a Frundles.
 In the 2nd series of Lexx, the "Light Universe" is being consumed by self-replicating Mantrid Dromes (arms) until they are coerced into massing together at the centre of that universe causing a Big Crunch.

See also
 
 Malware in fiction (category)
 Sociocultural evolution
 Technological evolution
 The Automated Society''

References